Devalokam ( Abode of gods) is an unfinished Indian Malayalam-language drama film directed by M. T. Vasudevan Nair in 1979. It had Sabu and Jayamala in the lead roles. Mammootty appeared in his debut credited role. The film was produced by Janasakthi Films.

Production
The shooting of the film was done at Palakkad. At that time, Mammootty was working as a lawyer at Manjeri court. According to P. N. Menon, as he described in his autobiography Nirakoottukal, Mammootty has to play the character named Pappachan in the film. The shooting was lagged due to financial problems and production eventually ceased due to conflicts among cast and crew due to the lack of funds.

References

Bibliography
Nirakoottukal-Autobiography by veteran P. N. Menon

External links
 

1970s unfinished films
1979 films
Unreleased Malayalam-language films
1970s Malayalam-language films